Anatoma concinna is a species of minute sea snail, a marine gastropod mollusk or micromollusk in the family Anatomidae.

Description
The ovate shell is rather depressed. The small spire is scarcely elevated and narrowly, profoundly umbilicate. The 2½ convex whorls are decussated by elevated radiating and concentric striae. The oblique aperture is suborbicular.

Distribution
This marine species occurs off Japan.

References

 Geiger D.L. (2012) Monograph of the little slit shells. Volume 1. Introduction, Scissurellidae. pp. 1-728. Volume 2. Anatomidae, Larocheidae, Depressizonidae, Sutilizonidae, Temnocinclidae. pp. 729–1291. Santa Barbara Museum of Natural History Monographs Number 7.
 Gulbin V.V. & Chaban E.M. (2012) Annotated list of shell-bearing gastropods of Commander Islands. Part I. The Bulletin of the Russian Far East Malacological Society 15-16: 5–30

External links
 To Encyclopedia of Life
 To World Register of Marine Species

Anatomidae
Gastropods described in 1862